Barry Scott and Second Wind was a bluegrass/bluegrass gospel band based out of the East Tennessee area. They are best known for their debut album In God's Time, which received a 2010 Grammy nomination for Best Southern, Country or Bluegrass Gospel Album. 

The band is also known for its a capella songs. The second album, Sunday Mornin' Meetin' Time, consists of a combination of a capella and instrumental tracks.

Scott formed the band  after performing for ten years as lead singer for the band Quicksilver.

The band has performed at the Lewis Family Homecoming & Bluegrass Festival
 and the Lincoln County Bluegrass and Gospel Sing. 

Barry Scott & Second Wind disbanded in December, 2010.

Band members
Barry Scott & Second Wind  members were Barry Scott (guitar and lead vocals), Jason Leek (bass and vocals), Matthew Munsey (mandolin and vocals), Travis Houck (dobro and vocals), and Zane Petty (banjo).

Discography

Studio albums

References

External links
Barry Scott & Second Wind Official Website
Rebel Records

American bluegrass music groups
Musical groups from Tennessee